Unbearable may refer to:

 "Unbearable" (CSI), an episode of the American crime drama CSI: Crime Scene Investigation
 Unbearable (short story collection), the fifth in a series of collections of short stories by Australian author Paul Jennings
 Unbearable (sculpture), a bronze sculpture by Jens Galschiot